Tapinella maculata is a species of thick barklouse in the family Pachytroctidae. It is found in the Caribbean Sea, Central America, North America, and South America.

References

Pachytroctidae
Articles created by Qbugbot
Insects described in 1956
Insects of North America
Insects of South America
Insects of the Caribbean